This is a list of topics in biodiversity.

A 

Abiotic stress —
Adaptation —
Agricultural biodiversity —
Agroecological restoration —
All-taxa biodiversity inventory —
Alpha diversity —
Applied ecology —
Arca-Net —
ASEAN Center for Biodiversity —
ASEAN Heritage Parks —
Aquatic biomonitoring —
Axe Lake Swamp State Nature Preserve —

B 
Bank of Natural Capital —
Beta diversity —
BioBlitz —
Biocomplexity —
Biocultural diversity —
Biodiversity action plan —
Biodiversity and drugs —
Biodiversity and food —
Biodiversity banking —
Biodiversity databases (list) —
Biodiversity hotspot —
Biodiversity in Israel, the West Bank, and the Gaza Strip —
Biodiversity Indicators Partnership —
Biodiversity informatics —
Biodiversity Monitoring Switzerland —
Biodiversity of Borneo —
Biodiversity of Cape Town —
Biogeography —
Bioindicator —
Bioinformatics —
BIOPAT - Patrons for Biodiversity —
Biorisk —
Biosafety Clearing-House —
BioSearch —
Biota by conservation status (list) —
Biosurvey —
BioWeb —
Body size and species richness —
Box corer —
Bray–Curtis dissimilarity —

C
Caribbean Initiative —
Carta di Siracusa on Biodiversity —
Cartagena Protocol on Biosafety —
Center for Biological Diversity —
Centres of Plant Diversity —
Chresonym —
Comisión Nacional para el Conocimiento y Uso de la Biodiversidad —
Conservation Biology —
Conservation Commons —
Conservation ethic —
Conservation in Papua New Guinea —
Conservation reliant species —
Conservation status —
Conservation status (biota - list) —
Convention on Biological Diversity —
Critically Endangered —
Crop diversity —

D 
Data Deficient —
Deforestation —
Diversitas —
Diversity-function debate —
Diversity index —

E 
ECNC-European Centre for Nature Conservation —
Ecological economics —
Ecological effects of biodiversity —
Ecological goods and services —
Ecological restoration —
Ecology —
Economics of biodiversity —
Ecosystem diversity —
EDGE species (list) —
Effect of climate change on plant biodiversity —
Eichler's rule —
Endemic Bird Areas of the World: Priorities for Biodiversity Conservation —
Endemic Species in Slovakia —
Endemism —
Enzootic —
Ethnic diversity —
Ewens sampling formula —
Extinct in the Wild —
Extinction —

F 
Felidae Conservation Fund —
Flora and vegetation of Turkey —
Forest farming —
Functional agrobiodiversity —

G 
Gamma diversity —
Gene pool —
Genetic diversity —
Genetic erosion —
Genetic pollution —
Global 200 —
Global Biodiversity Information Facility —
Global biodiversity —
Global Crop Diversity Trust —
Global warming —
Green Revolution —

H 
Habitat conservation —
Habitat fragmentation —
Heirloom plant —
Heirloom tomato —
Holocene extinction event —

I 
Indicator species —
Indicator value —
Insect biodiversity —
Intact forest landscape —
Inter-American Biodiversity Information Network —
Intergovernmental Science-Policy Platform on Biodiversity and Ecosystem Services —
Intermediate Disturbance Hypothesis —
International Cooperative Biodiversity Group —
International Council for Game and Wildlife Conservation —
International Day for Biological Diversity —
International Institute of Tropical Agriculture —
International Mechanism of Scientific Expertise on Biodiversity —
International Treaty on Plant Genetic Resources for Food and Agriculture —
International Union for Conservation of Nature —
International Year of Biodiversity —
IUCN Red List —
IUCN Red List vulnerable species (list) —

K 
Key Biodiversity Areas —

L 
Land use, land-use change and forestry —
Langtang National Park —
Latitudinal gradients in species diversity —
Least Concern —
List of biodiversity databases —
List of environmental issues —
List of environmental topics —
Livestock Keepers' Rights —
Living Planet Index —
Local Biodiversity Action Plan —

M 
Man and the Biosphere Programme —
Measurement of biodiversity —
Measurement of biodiversity (list) —
Megadiverse countries —
Millennium Ecosystem Assessment —
Millennium Seed Bank Project —
Monoculture —
Monodominance —
Mutation —

N 
NaGISA —
National Biodiversity Centre (Singapore) —
National Biodiversity Network —
National Biological Information Infrastructure —
Native Vegetation Management Framework —
Natural environment —
Natural heritage —
Natural landscape —
Nature —
Nature Conservation Act vulnerable flora of Queensland (list) —
NatureServe —
NatureServe conservation status —
Near Threatened —
Niche apportionment models —
Not Evaluated —
Nutritional biodiversity —
NatureServe vulnerable species (list) —

O 
Occupancy–abundance relationship —
Organic farming and biodiversity —

P 
Park Grass Experiment —
Parsa National Park —
Phylogenetic diversity —
Plant Resources of Tropical Africa —

R 
Range condition scoring —
Rank abundance curve —
Rare species —
Rarefaction (ecology) —
Reconciliation ecology —
RECOrd (Local Biological Records Centre) —
Regional Red List —
Relative species abundance —
Renkonen similarity index —

S 
Satoyama —
SAVE Foundation —
Seedbank —
Seedy Sunday —
Shivapuri Nagarjun National Park —
Soil biodiversity —
Species evenness —
Species richness —
Subsurface Lithoautotrophic Microbial Ecosystem —
Sustainability —
Sustainable development —
Sustainable forest management —

T 
The Economics of Ecosystems and Biodiversity —
Threatened species —

U 
Unified neutral theory of biodiversity —
United Nations Decade on Biodiversity —
University of California, Riverside Herbarium —

V 
Vulnerable animals —
Vulnerable fauna of the United States —
Vulnerable flora of Queensland, Nature Conservation Act list —
Vulnerable plants —
Vulnerable species —
Vulnerable species, IUCN Red List —
Vulnerable species, NatureServe (list) —

W 
Wild Solutions —
Wildlife preserve —
Wooded meadow —
World Conservation Monitoring Centre —
World Conservation Union —
World Forestry Congress —
World Network of Biosphere Reserves —

Y 
Yasuni National Park

See also
 Index of evolutionary biology articles

Biodiversity topics
Biodiversity